Anopina bicolor is a moth of the family Tortricidae. It is found in Costa Rica.

References

Moths described in 2000
bicolor
Moths of Central America